Brighton College Preparatory School is a private preparatory school in Brighton, England and is the junior section to Brighton College. The School teaches children from  8 to 13 years.

The Good Schools Guide in a description said: "This School seems such a fun place to be".

References

External links
ISI Inspection Reports - Nursery & Pre-Prep & Prep School
Profile on the ISC website

Private schools in Brighton and Hove
Preparatory schools in East Sussex